Saturnino Martínez (1928 – 7 November 1960) was a Mexican football defender who played for Mexico in the 1954 FIFA World Cup. He also played for Club Necaxa.

References

External links
FIFA profile

1928 births
Mexican footballers
Mexico international footballers
Association football defenders
Club Necaxa footballers
Liga MX players
1954 FIFA World Cup players
1960 deaths